The 1993 PGA Championship was the 75th PGA Championship, held August 12–15 at Inverness Club in Toledo, Ohio.

Paul Azinger won his only major title on the second hole of a sudden-death playoff with Greg Norman. Azinger birdied four of the last seven holes to get into the playoff. Norman, the 1993 Open champion, joined Craig Wood as the only players to lose playoffs in all four major championships. It was the fifth playoff under the sudden-death format at the PGA Championship, first used in 1977.

Norman was attempting to become the first player to win the Open Championship and PGA Championship in the same year since Walter Hagen in 1924. It was accomplished the following year by Nick Price, and later by Tiger Woods in 2000 and 2006, Pádraig Harrington in 2008 and Rory McIlroy in 2014.

It was the sixth major championship at Inverness, which hosted the PGA Championship in 1986 and four U.S. Opens (1920, 1931, 1957, and 1979). Norman was also the British Open champion and PGA runner-up in 1986, when Bob Tway holed out from a greenside bunker at the 72nd hole for birdie. Forced to sink his chip to tie, Norman ran it ten feet (3 m) past and bogeyed.

Tom Watson, age 43, was in search of a PGA Championship win to complete a career grand slam. He was a stroke behind after 54 holes, but bogeyed three of the first five holes and finished four strokes back in fifth. Watson later had top ten finishes in 1994 and 2000, but never won the title.

Course layout

Source:

Lengths of the course for previous major championships:

Round summaries

First round
Thursday, August 12, 1993

Second round
Friday, August 13, 1993

Third round
Saturday, August 14, 1993

Final round
Sunday, August 15, 1993

Source:

Scorecard

Final round

Cumulative tournament scores, relative to par
Source:

Playoff
The sudden-death playoff began on the 18th hole, a  par-4. Again both hit the fairway and the green. Norman's downhill  birdie attempt ended four feet (1.3 m) short, and Azinger's from seven feet (2.1 m) lipped out, and he tapped in for par. Norman's attempt to save par also rimmed out, and the playoff was over.

Sudden-death playoff was played on holes 18 and 10, both par fours.

References

External links
PGA.com – 1993 PGA Championship
Yahoo! Sports: 1993 PGA Championship leaderboard

PGA Championship
Golf in Ohio
Sports competitions in Ohio
Sports in Toledo, Ohio
PGA Championship
PGA Championship
PGA Championship
PGA Championship